The Ring Virus is a 1999 South Korean horror film adapted from the Japanese novel Ring by Koji Suzuki. A joint project between Japan and Korea, this version has Park Eun-Suh as the creator of the cursed videotape. Although the filmmakers claimed that the film was adapted from the novel only, it differs from the novel in some ways that match the 1998 film Ring (also known as "Ringu" in the US), such as having a female lead character, and several scenes were directly copied, including some of the scenes on the videotape and the film's climax.

This remake only exists because South Korea had a ban on Japanese cultural imports, preventing Ring from being released over there. A remake for the South Korean market had to be commissioned instead. The ban was eventually lifted in late 1998, but production for the film had already been completed.

Plot
Followed by the death of her friends, journalist Hong Sun-Joo comes across a videotape containing incomprehensible images. Towards the end of the tape, she finds the curse which states that the viewer would die at the same time next week if he/she does not perform certain tasks. However, the next scene explaining the nature of the task has been erased. Sun-Joo and a doctor named Choi-Yul embark on a journey to break the curse placed upon them. They discover that the videotape was made by the psychic called Park Eun-Suh. Eun-Suh was an illegitimate daughter of a female psychic and was born an intersex. She was romantically involved with her half-brother and worked in a night club for a while. There, a man who found out about her secrets was killed as she had the uncanny ability to protect herself. The video tape is the medium Eun-Suh uses to reveal herself to the society. Her first exposure to the media was a painful experience, which caused her to withdraw from the outside world. When it became difficult for her to relate to the society, she retaliated by infiltrating it like a virus. The way of infiltration is one-way only and any attempt to block the process ends in extremely negative consequences.

Cast
 Jung Jin-young as Choi Yeol
 Shin Eun-kyung as Hong Sun-joo
 Kim Chang-wan as Reporter Kim		
 Bae Doona as Park Eun-suh
 Lee Seung-hyeon		
 Kim Ggoch-ji 		
 Yu Yeon-su

Release
The Ring Virus was released in South Korea on 12 June 1999.

See also
 List of South Korean films of 1999

References

External links
 
 
 
 Snowblood Apple Ring Comparison - comparison of Ring, The Ring, and The Ring Virus films.

The Ring (franchise)
1999 horror films
South Korean ghost films
South Korean horror films
Films based on Japanese novels
1999 films
South Korean remakes of Japanese films
1990s Japanese films